Bell Brand Foods, Inc. was founded by Cyril C. Nigg in 1925, the company was a Southern California-based manufacturer of a regionally popular line of snack products including potato chips, tortilla chips,  corn chips, cheese curls and pretzels. The company's headquarters were located in Santa Fe Springs, California. G.F. Industries put Bell Brand up for sale in 1995 due to the company's financial issues. However, Bell Brand went out of business on July 7, 1995 after G.F. could not find a buyer for the company. Bell potato chips had a bell shaped potato chip in every bag.

References

Brand name snack foods

1925 establishments in California
American companies established in 1925
Food and drink companies established in 1925
Defunct manufacturing companies based in Greater Los Angeles
1995 disestablishments in California
American companies disestablished in 1995
Food and drink companies disestablished in 1995
Food and drink companies based in California
Defunct food and drink companies of the United States